Sea devils are the family of deep-sea anglerfish known as the Ceratiidae, from the Greek keras, "horn", referring to the bioluminescent lure that projects from the fishes' forehead.

They are among the most widespread of the anglerfishes, found in all oceans from the tropics to the Antarctic. They are large and elongated: females of the largest species, Krøyer's deep sea angler fish, Ceratias holboelli, reach  in length. Males, by contrast, are much smaller, reaching , and, like other anglerfishes, spend much of their lives attached to a female after a free-living adolescent stage in which they are very small – at most  – and have sharp, beak-like, toothless jaws. One or more males attach themselves permanently to a female, eventually merging circulatory systems. As this genetic chimera matures, the male grows large testicles, while the rest of its body atrophies. Ceratiidae are the only creatures known to become chimeras as a normal part of their lifecycle.

References 

 
Deep sea fish
Marine fish families
Taxa named by Theodore Gill